This is a list of business schools in Pakistan.

Azad Kashmir 
 Mirpur University of Science and Technology, Mirpur - BBA, MBA, BBF
 University of Management Sciences and Information Technology, Kotli - BBA, MBA

Balochistan
 Balochistan University of Information Technology, Engineering and Management Sciences, Quetta - BBA, MBA
 University of Turbat, Turbat - BBA, MBA

Gilgit-Balitistan
Karakoram International University, Gilgit and Skardu campuses - BBA, MBA

Islamabad Capital Territory
 Air University School of Management Islamabad - BBA, MBA, PhD, BSAF
 Bahria University, Islamabad - BBA, MBA, MS
 Capital University of Science & Technology (CUST), Islamabad - BBA, MBA
 ComSATS Institute of Information Technology, Islamabad - BBA, MBA, MS, PhD
 Institute of Business and Leadership (IBL), Islamabad - ACCA, CFA, CMA, HND, PGD.
 Islamabad Business School (IBS), Islamabad - BBA, MBA, MS, PhD
 Foundation University, Islamabad - BBA, MBA
 Hamdard University, Islamabad - BBA, MBA
 International Islamic University, Islamabad - BBA, MBA
 Iqra University, Islamabad - BBA, MBA, MS, PhD
 MDi Business School (MDi), Islamabad - International BBA, MBA, Master of Project Management, Dual Masters (MBA + MPM)
 National University of Computer and Emerging Sciences (NUCES and FAST-NU), Islamabad - BBA, BS (Accounting and Finance), MBA
 National University of Modern Languages (NUML), Islamabad - BBA, MBA
 National University of Sciences and Technology (NUST), Islamabad - BBA, MBA
 Pakistan Institute of Development Economics, Islamabad - BBA, MBA
 Quaid-i-Azam School of Management Sciences, Quaid-i-Azam University, Islamabad - BBA, MBA, MPA, MPhil, PhD
 Riphah International University, Islamabad - BBA, MBA, MS
 School of Business and Management (SBM), Islamabad - CA, CIA, ACCA, ICMA, CIMA, PIPFA 
 Shaheed Zulfiqar Ali Bhutto Institute of Science and Technology (SZABIST), Islamabad - BBA, MBA, MS, MSPM, PhD
 Shifa Tameer-e-Millat University, Islamabad - MBA
 University of Lahore, Islamabad - BBA, MBA

Khyber Pakhtunkhwa 
 Abasyn University, Peshawar - BBA
 Abbottabad University of Sciences & Technology - BBA, MBA, MPhil, BBS, MPA, B.Com M.Com, MS, PhD
 Abdul Wali Khan University Mardan - BBA, MBA, MPA
 CECOS University of Information Technology and Emerging Sciences, Peshawar - BBA, MBA
 ComSATS Institute of Information Technology, Abbottabad - BBA, MBA, MS, PhD
 Gandhara University, Peshawar - BBA, MBA
 Ghulam Ishaq Khan Institute of Engineering Sciences and Technology, Topi, Khyber Pakhtunkhwa - BS (Management Science)
 Hazara University, Mansehra - BBA, MBA, Mphil, BBS, MPA, B.Com M.Com, Ms, PhD
 Institute of Management Sciences, Peshawar - BBA, MBA, MS
 Qurtuba University, Dera Ismail Khan - BBA, MBA
 Sarhad University of Science and Information Technology, Peshawar - BBA, MBA
 Shaheed Benazir Bhutto Women University, Peshawar - BBA, MBA
 University of Haripur, Haripur - BBA, MBA
 University of Swat, Swat District - BBA, BBS, MBA
 University of Peshawar, Institute of Management Studies - BBA, MBA

Punjab
 National Textile University, Faisalabad - BBA, MBA
 FAISALABAD BUSINESS SCHOOL , FBS , National Textile University, Faisalabad
 Bahria University, Lahore - BBA, MBA
 Bahauddin Zakariya University, Multan - BBA MBA MS PhD
 ComSATS Institute of Information Technology, Attock - BBA, MBA
 ComSATS Institute of Information Technology, Lahore - BBA, MBA
 ComSATS Institute of Information Technology, Wah - BBA, BBS, MBA, MS (Management Sciences), MS (Banking & Finance)
 FC College University, Lahore, Business School - BBA, MBA, EMBA
 GIFT University, Gujranwala - BBA, MBA
 Global Institute, Lahore - BBA, MBA
 Hailey College of Banking & Finance, University of the Punjab, Lahore - BBA, MBA
 Hailey College of Commerce, University of the Punjab, Lahore - B.Com, M.Com, M.Phil, PhD
 Hajvery University, Lahore - BBA, MBA
 Imperial College of Business Studies, Lahore - BBA, MBA
 Institute of Administrative Sciences, University of the Punjab, Lahore - BS (Management), MPA
 Institute of Business Management, University of Engineering and Technology, Lahore (UET) - BBA, MBA
 Institute of Management Sciences, Lahore (Pak-AIMS) - BBA, MBA
 Lahore College for Women University, Lahore - BBA, B.Com
 Lahore School of Economics, Lahore - BBA, B.Sc, MBA
 Lahore University of Management Sciences
 National College of Business Administration and Economics - BBA, MBA
 National University of Computer and Emerging Sciences (NUCES and FAST-NU), Lahore - BBA, BS (Accounting and Finance), MBA
 Pir Mehr Ali Shah Arid Agriculture University, Rawalpindi - BBA, MBA
 The Superior College, Lahore - BBA, MBA
 University of Central Punjab, Lahore - BBA, MBA
 University of Education, Lahore - BBA
 University of Education Lahore (Multan Campus) - BBA

 University of Lahore, Lahore - BBA, MBA
 University of Management and Technology, Lahore - BBA, MBA, MS, PhD
 University of Sargodha, Sargodha - BBA, MBA
 University of South Asia, Lahore - BBA, MBA
 University of Veterinary and Animal Sciences, Lahore - BBA, MBA
 University of Wah, Wah Cantonment - BBA, MBA

Sindh
 Bahria University, Karachi - BBA, MBA
 DHA Suffa University, Karachi - BBA, MBA
 Dow University of Health Sciences, Karachi - MBA
 Greenwich University, Karachi - BBA, MBA
 Ilma University, Karachi - BBA, MBA
 Indus University, Karachi - BBA, MBA
 Institute of Business Administration (IBA), Karachi - BBA, MBA, MS Computer Sciences, BS Accounting and Finance, MS Economics
 Institute of Business Management (IoBM), Karachi - BBA, MBA, MS
 Iqra University (IU), Karachi - (Business University) BBA, MBA, BS Accounting and Finance,  BS Islamic Banking and Finance, BS Economics and Finance, M.PHIL in Management Sciences, PhD in Management Sciences, BS in Management, Entrepreneurship, and Business Administration (MEBA)
 Isra University, Hyderabad, Sindh - BBA, MBA
 Jinnah University for Women, Karachi - BBA, MBA, EMBA
 Karachi Institute of Economics and Technology (PAF-KIET), Karachi - BBA, MBA
 Karachi School of Business & Leadership (KSBL), Karachi - MBA
 KASB Institute of Technology (KASBIT), Karachi - BBA, MBA
 Preston University, BBA, MBA
 Salim Habib University, Korangi Creek, Karachi - BBA, MBA
 Shah Abdul Latif University, Khairpur - BBA, MBA
 Shaheed Benazir Bhutto University, Shaheed Benazirabad - BBA, MBA
 Shaheed Zulfiqar Ali Bhutto Institute of Science and Technology (SZABIST), Karachi - BBA, MBA
 Sindh Madrasatul Islam, Karachi - BBA, MBA
 Sukkur Institute of Business Administration, Sukkur - BBA, MBA
 University of Karachi (UoK), Karachi - BBA, MBA

References

 
Pakistan